Grenadine Records was an independent record label based in Montreal, Quebec, Canada. The music label was founded in 1997 by Eric Y. Lapointe and Alex Megelas who met at Bishop's University's radio station CJMQ-FM.

The label, initially named Bittersweet Records, released two 7" vinyl records and then changed its name in 1999 when a New York City-based label of the same name was discovered.  The label was officially announced as Grenadine Records as of March 1999 along with its first CD release Syrup & Gasoline Vol.1 which was a compilation of bands from across Canada. The label's tagline of "Timeless Pop Attitude" reflected the label's interest in a variety of pop music with sometimes earlier influences.

As part of its commitment to a range of musical expressions, the label released albums in both English and French.

Artists
The following artists have released albums with Grenadine Records:
Alexis O'Hara
the American Devices
Blurtonia
the Dears
 Eux Autres
the Frenetics
LowBrow
Melon Galia
music for mapmakers
Nightwood
Les Sequelles
Shy Child
Starvin Hungry
Tricky Woo
Shane Watt

See also
 List of record labels

References

External links
Grenadine Records

Record labels established in 1997
Quebec record labels
Canadian independent record labels
Indie rock record labels